The RE80 is a RegioExpress service that runs every half-hour between  and  in the Swiss canton of Ticino, with every other train continuing to  in Milan, Italy. The service is operated by Treni Regionali Ticino Lombardia (TILO), a joint venture between the Swiss Federal Railways and Trenord.

Operations 

History 
The opening of the Ceneri Base Tunnel transformed regional services in Ticino. This timetable was only temporary, and beginning on 5 April 2021 the RE80 began running half-hourly to Chiasso and hourly to Milano Centrale, replacing the RE10.

References

External links 
 
 Official site

Rail transport in Ticino
Transport in Lombardy